Hilary Brougher is a screenwriter and director based in New York City. She is known for her 2006 feature film Stephanie Daley starring Tilda Swinton and Melissa Leo.

Career 
Brougher's career began in 1996, when she wrote and directed her first feature film, The Sticky Fingers of Time. The film was an official selection at the Venice, Rotterdam, SXSW, and Toronto International Film Festivals. It was released theatrically in the U.S. in 1997.

In 2006, she released her second feature Stephanie Daley, starring Tilda Swinton, Amber Tamblyn, Melissa Leo, Tim Hutton and Denis O’Hare. The film won several accolades, including the Waldo Salt Screenwriting Award at the Sundance Film Festival. Amber Tamblyn received Best Actress at Locarno Film Festival for her role in the film as a sixteen-year-old girl accused of killing her newborn child. The film was bought by Lifetime Television and the title was changed to What She Knew.

In 2014, Brougher worked as director and co-writer with Tristine Skyler of an adaptation of Jane Mendelsohn’s novel, Innocence.

Her most recent film South Mountain, starring Talia Balsam, premiered at SXSW in 2019. The film received mostly positive reviews with articles featured in The Hollywood Reporter, Variety and IndieWire.

She is currently working on the documentary Striper about the art and life of Jay Rosenblum, an artist killed in a tragic accident in 1989. The film is co-directed by producer Maria Rosenblum, who is also the daughter of the film's subject.

Brougher is a professor and full-time member of Faculty in the MFA Film Program, at Columbia University School of the Arts. She also chaired the program from 2019-2021.

Films

Director 

South Mountain, 2019
Wake O Wake (Short), 2016
Jabberwocky, West Shokan (Short), 2015
Innocence, 2013
Stephanie Daley, 2006
The Sticky Fingers of Time, 1997

Writer 

 South Mountain, 2019
 Wake O Wake (Short), 2016
 Innocence, 2013
 Stephanie Daley, 2006
 The Sticky Fingers of Time, 1997

Editor 

 Jabberwocky, West Shokan (Short), 2015
 The Sticky Fingers of Time, 1997

Awards and nominations

Awards 

 Sundance Film Festival 2006, Waldo Scott Screenwriting Award
 Milan International Film Festival, 2006 Best Director
 Jackson Hole International Film Festival, 2006 Best Director
 Midlife Achievement Award – Maine International Film Festival, 2019

Nominations 

 Deauville Film Festival- Grand Special Prize, 2006
 Locarno International Film Festival- Golden Leopard, 2006
 Sundance Film Festival- Grand Jury Award, 2006
 Mar del Plata Film Festival- Best Film, 2019
 SXSW Film Festival- Grand Jury Award, 2019

References

Further reading
Magazine article about Brougher

Columbia University faculty
Year of birth missing (living people)
Living people
American filmmakers